The 2018 President's Cup was a professional tennis tournament played on outdoor hard courts. It was the thirteenth (ATP) and tenth (ITF) editions of the tournament and was part of the 2018 ATP Challenger Tour and the 2018 ITF Women's Circuit. It took place in Astana, Kazakhstan, on 16–22 July 2018.

Men's singles main draw entrants

Seeds

 1 Rankings are as of 2 July 2018.

Other entrants
The following players received wildcards into the singles main draw:
  Sagadat Ayap
  Farrukh Dustov
  Timur Khabibulin
  Aleksandr Nedovyesov

The following players received entry from the qualifying draw:
  Hugo Grenier
  Pavel Kotov
  Saketh Myneni
  Khumoyun Sultanov

The following players received entry as lucky losers:
  Arjun Kadhe
  Dzmitry Zhyrmont

Women's singles main draw entrants

Seeds 

 1 Rankings as of 2 July 2018.

Other entrants 
The following players received a wildcard into the singles main draw:
  Anastasia Astakhova
  Anna Danilina
  Dariya Detkovskaya
  Ng Kwan-yau

The following players received entry from the qualifying draw:
  Darya Astakhova
  Anastasia Frolova
  Bojana Jovanovski Petrović
  Ksenia Laskutova

Champions

Men's singles

 Sebastian Ofner def.  Daniel Brands, 7–6(7–5), 6–3

Women's singles

 Ekaterine Gorgodze def.  Sabina Sharipova, 6–4, 6–1

Men's doubles

 Mikhail Elgin /  Yaraslav Shyla def.  Arjun Kadhe /  Denis Yevseyev, 7–5, 7–6(8–6)

Women's doubles

 Berfu Cengiz /  Anna Danilina def.  Akgul Amanmuradova /  Ekaterine Gorgodze, 3–6, 6–3, [10–7]

External links 
 2018 President's Cup at ITFtennis.com
 Official website

2018 ITF Women's Circuit
2018 ATP Challenger Tour
2018 in Kazakhstani sport
Tennis tournaments in Kazakhstan
President's Cup (tennis)
July 2018 sports events in Kazakhstan